Snapp House may refer to:

Snapp House (Buechel, Kentucky), listed on the National Register of Historic Places in Jefferson County, Kentucky
Snapp House (Fishers Hill, Virginia), listed on the National Register of Historic Places in Shenandoah County, Virginia